Gressingham is a small village and civil parish in the City of Lancaster  in the English county of Lancashire.  It is north of the River Lune and across the river from Hornby. In the 2001 census, it had a population of 153, decreasing slightly to 151 at the 2011 census.

St John the Evangelist's Church was originally built in the 12th century and is a Grade I listed building.  It was partly rebuilt in 1734, and restored by Edward Paley in 1862.

The Gressingham Duck was named after the village of Gressingham, having been first bred here in 1980 from a cross of mallards and Pekin ducks. However,  the exclusive right to breed Gressingham Ducks was bought by Gressingham Foods in 1996, and the ducks they now produce are all from their farms in East Anglia.

Notable people
John Young Stratton (1829/30 – 1905): author, essayist, social reformer and campaigner against rural poverty.

See also
Listed buildings in Gressingham

References

External links

Geography of the City of Lancaster
Civil parishes in Lancashire
Villages in Lancashire
Forest of Bowland